Félicien Tshamalenga Kabundi (born 15 May 1980) is a football defender from Congo DR. He currently plays for TP Mazembe in DR Congo.

External links

Democratic Republic of the Congo footballers
Living people
1980 births
TP Mazembe players
Association football defenders
Democratic Republic of the Congo international footballers